Bala Saravanan (born 2 November 1987) is an Indian actor and comedian who has appeared in Tamil language films.

Career
Bala made his debut as an actor in Vijay TV's school drama serial "Kallikattu Pallikoodam" and came to notice in the Vijay TV college drama series Kana Kaanum Kaalangal Kalloriyin Kadhai. He then went on to appear in comedy roles in films. His first film was Ego and he achieved notice playing the character of Pappu in the film Kuttipuli. He received praise for his comic performances in Thirudan Police and Darling. Critics stated that he was "a scream"  and "keeps you in splits" in Thirudan Police.

Filmography

Films

Television
 Kalli Kaatu Pallikoodam
 Kana Kaanum Kaalangal Kalloriyin Kadhai

Web series
 Vilangu

References

External links

1987 births
Indian male film actors
Living people
Male actors from Madurai
Tamil comedians
Male actors in Tamil cinema
Indian male comedians
21st-century Indian male actors